Doreen Seidel (born 19 September 1985 in Chemnitz) is a German racecar driver, racing instructor, Playmate and model. She made her debut as a racing driver in the 2011 ADAC Cruze Cup. In her career as a racing driver, Seidel has participated in both sprint car racing and endurance racing. She was Germany's Playmate Of The Year in 2008, and appeared in several international editions of Playboy.

Early life 
Doreen Seidel was born in Chemnitz, Germany on September 19, 1985. She graduated from high school at the age of 18, and studied business administration in Wiesbaden, before deciding to move to Frankfurt and study marketing. Growing up near the Sachsenring race track, Seidel was interested in motorbike racing from an early age. She bought her first motorcycle, a Yamaha R6, at the age of 18.

Modelling career 
Seidel gained national recognition as a model when she appeared as May's Playmate of the Month in the German edition of Playboy in 2008. That same year, she was voted Germany's Playmate of the Year.

She graced the cover of the January 2009 issue with the other eleven Playmates of 2008, and was featured in a photo spread. Later that year, she was on the cover of the July 2009 issue alongside Leonor Perez and Magdalena Sierka, all three of whom were featured in a 14-page photo spread.

Seidel appeared alongside Janine Habeck, Giuliana Marino, Sandra Latko and Daniela Wolf in Playboy's April 2011 edition which celebrated Hugh Hefner's 85th birthday.

In addition to the German edition of Playboy, Seidel was also a Playmate in several other international editions, including Mexico, Spain, Russia, Poland, Greece, Argentina, Romania and Hungary. She was featured on the cover of the Bulgarian edition of the magazine.

Seidel was the grid girl in the Deutsche Tourenwagen Masters for a team sponsored by Playboy, an experience which helped to inspire her to enter professional racing as a driver, and she later raced in a support series for the DTM. In 2019, she reported for Playboy on Burning Man in 2019.

Seidel modelled for a Valentine's Day anti-fur campaign by PETA with the motto "Love is in - fur is out". She was also featured as a model for an advertising series of the technology portal CHIP Online, and shot a commercial for a denture company with Mario Teusch.

Racing career

2011-2014 (ADAC, Scirocco R-Cup) 
Doreen Seidel made her racing debut in the 2011 . She also competed in the 2012 , taking three podium finishes and finishing the cup in fourth place in the overall ranking.

In 2013 she took part in the Mini Trophy as part of the ADAC GT Masters. In May 2014, she competed in the Volkswagen Scirocco R-Cup as part of the supporting program for the Deutsche Tourenwagen Masters.

2015-2018 (Audi Sport TT Cup, GT4 European Series) 
Since 2015, Seidel has also been active as a motorsport instructor for brands such as Mercedes-Benz, Audi, Porsche and Ferrari. Seidel completed the 2015 Audi Sport TT Cup, where she took the podium five times and finished third in the overall guest ranking.

She entered the Reiter's Young Stars Cup in 2016, and finished 5th overall in the women's ranking. She subsequently competed in the 2016 GT4 European Series, and finished in the 28th position. She also competed in the 2016 British GT Championship.

In 2017, she competed in the 24H Series, and returned to an ADAC Chevrolet Cup car to complete the Boerdesprint.

2018-present (EXR series, W Series)  
Seidel is currently a driver and racing instructor for the Exotics racing team. She drove in the 2018 EXR Racing series, and in 2019, Seidel became the first woman to win in the EXR series at the Las Vegas Motor Speedway. She also finished third-fastest in the Michelin World Time Trial Challenge, setting the challenge's record for fastest female driver.

Later that year, she participated in the W Series selection for its inaugural season.

Television appearances 
Seidel was featured in the DVD-special The 12 Playmates: 2008 which was issued with the July 2009 issue of Playboy. She was subsequently featured in Top 5: Germany's Hottest Playmates of All Time which was distributed with the April 2011 issue.

She has since appeared in several television series. She was a contestant in the German reality competition show  in 2008, and in 2009 she was a contestant in the German edition of Solitary which was broadcast on ProSieben. On September 21, 2014, Seidel was, among others, the playmates Franzy Balfanz, Helen De Muro and Sarah Nowak as part of the second episode of the RTL-II program Columbus - Das Erlebnismagazin . She also appeared on the late night talk show MTV Home and on Punkt 12.

External links 

 Official website

 Doreen Seidel at Playboy

References 

1985 births
Living people
People from Chemnitz
German female racing drivers
2000s Playboy Playmates
Playboy Playmates of the Year
24H Series drivers
Audi Sport TT Cup drivers
German models
GT4 European Series drivers